Blotzheim is a commune in the Haut-Rhin department, Alsace, northeastern France.

See also

 Communes of the Haut-Rhin department

References

External links

www.blotzheim.fr/

Communes of Haut-Rhin